The Great Western Loop is a  long hiking route that passes through several states of the western United States. 

It links together five long-distance hiking trails: the Pacific Crest Trail, the Pacific Northwest Trail, the Continental Divide Trail, the Grand Enchantment Trail, and the Arizona Trail. It traverses the Mojave Desert, the Sonoran Desert, 12 National Parks, and 75 wilderness areas.

Andrew Skurka, a professional backpacker, was the first to complete the Great Western Loop. On April 9, 2007, Skurka began the route from the Grand Canyon. Jeff Garmire became the second person to complete the route, doing so in 2018. Jeff Garmire started on April 30 and finished on November 24, totaling  208 days on the trail. In 2021, Niels Rabe completed a slightly different version of the Great Western Loop due to extensive wildfires in Washington and California. He became the first person to complete the route counter-clockwise after 222 days on trail. Also in 2021, Logan Demas (“Sandman”) completed the ‘Greatest Western Loop’ by hiking the original loop and adding sections to complete both the PCT and CDT. At almost 40 years old, he is also the oldest person to complete the Loop. In 2022, Nick ("Chezwick") Gagnon completed the trail in 197 days and 11 hours. This FKT compares to Jeff Garmire in 2018 and guide Andrew Skurka in 2007, who both completed the route in 208 days.

References 

 
 
 
 
 
 (https://www.outsideonline.com/outdoor-adventure/hiking-and-backpacking/nick-gagnon-great-western-loop-record/)

 

Hiking trails in Canada
Long-distance trails in the United States
Hiking trails in the United States
Hiking trails in Arizona
Hiking trails in California 
Hiking trails in Colorado 
Hiking trails in Idaho 
Hiking trails in Montana  
Hiking trails in New Mexico
Hiking trails in Oregon
Hiking trails in Wyoming
Hiking trails in Washington (state)